The following is a timeline of the history of the city of Tunis, Tunisia.

Prior to 13th century

 819 BCE - Founding of the Carthaginian Empire
 146 BCE – Romans sack Tunis.
 737 CE – Ez-Zitouna madrassa founded.
 800-909 – Tunis was one of the residences of the Aghlabids dynasty.
 863 – Al-Zaytuna Mosque built.
 902 – City becomes capital of Ifriqiya.
 945 – Kharijite insurgents occupy city.
 1159 – Almohads in power; Tunis becomes capital city.

13th–18th centuries
 1227 – Abul Hasan ash-Shadhili founds his first zawiya in Tunis.
 1229 – Hafsids in power.
 1230 – Kasbah Mosque built.
 1252 – Al Haoua Mosque built.
 1270 – Louis IX of France takes power.
 1320 – Bab el Khadra built.
 1350 – Bab Saadoun built (approximate date).
 1534 – Conquest of Tunis by Hayreddin Barbarossa; Ottomans in power.
 1535
 Conquest of Tunis by Spanish Empire.
 Fortress built at La Goulette.
 1574 – Conquest of Tunis by Ottomans.
 1609  – 80,000 Moriscos arrive in Tunis after expulsion from Spain, the highest number since 1492.
 1624 – Soubhan Allah Mosque built (approximate date).
 1631 – Youssef Dey Mosque established.
 1648 – Ksar Mosque renovated.
 1655 – Hammouda Pacha Mosque built.
 1685 – Arrival of the first community of Livorno Jews (known as 'Granas') in Tunis
 1692 – Sidi Mahrez Mosque built.
 1710 – Bab Jazira Mosque built.
 1726 – El Jedid Mosque built.
 1741 – Ali II ibn Hussein grants a charter to the Livorno Jews (Granas) in Tunis.
 1756 – An Algerian army captures Tunis, deposing Abu l-Hasan Ali I and installing Muhammad I ar-Rashid

19th century

 1811 – Rebellion.
 1813 – Sabkha Mosque restored.
 1814 – Saheb Ettabaâ Mosque built.
 1818 – Plague strikes Tunis killing up to 50,000 and depopulating the city as people flee.
 1819 – Dar Lasram built.
 1840 – Military academy founded at Bardo by Ahmed Bey
 1857 – Batto Sfez Affair.
 1860 –
 Old city walls demolished.
 Tunisia's first official printing press established in Tunis. First edition of the Official Gazette of the Republic of Tunisia published.
 1872 – Tunis-Goulette-Marsa railway begins operating.
 1875 – Sadiki College founded.
 1881 – City occupied by French.
 1882 – Alaoui Museum dedicated.
 1885 – Bibliothèque Francaise established.
 1892 – Consulate of France building constructed.
 1893 – Canal opens.
 1897 – Cathedral of St. Vincent de Paul opens.
 1900 – Lycée de la Rue du Pacha founded.

20th century

 1901 – Palais de Justice built.
 1903 – Compagnie des tramways de Tunis founded
 1906 – Population: 227,519.
 1906 – Thala-Kasserine Disturbances
 1907 – Young Tunisians founded
 1908 – Omnia Pathé opens.
 1910 – Belvedère Park opens.
 1911 – Jellaz Affair
 1912 – Tunis Tram Boycott
 1914 – Hotel Majestic built.
 1919 – Espérance Sportive de Tunis founded.
 1920
 Club Africain sport club founded.
 Municipal Theatre built.
 1923 – Tunis Institute of Fine Arts founded.
 1924 – National Library opens.
 1931
 Coliseum built.
 Hajjamine Mosque restored.
 1932 – Hotel Claridge built.
 1934 – The Rachidia Institute founded to preserve traditional Tunisian music.
 1935 – El Omrane Mosque built.
 1936 – Population: 219,578.
 1937 – Grand synagogue opens.
 1942 – November – Occupation of city by Axis powers begins.
 1943 – May – Allies oust Axis forces.
 1944 – Tunis–Carthage International Airport developed.
 1946 – Population: 364,593.
 1948 – Stade Tunisien football club founded.
 1953 – Election boycott.
 1956
 Independence from France
 Zitouna University formed.
 Lycée Francais de Mutuelleville and National Library of Tunisia established.
 1957 – Monarchy abolished
 1958 – Central Bank of Tunisia headquartered in Tunis.
 1959 – City designated capital of Tunisian Republic.
 1963 – Parc Zoologique de la Ville de Tunis set up.
 1964 – Carthage International Festival begins.
 1966
 First Carthage Film Festival
 Population: 468,997 city; 647,640 urban agglomeration.
 1967 – Stade El Menzah built.
 1969
 Bourse de Tunis founded.
 Tunisian Symphony Orchestra established.
 1973 – Tunisia Private University founded.
 1976 – Puppet theatre established.
 1978 – Museum of Popular Arts and Tradition inaugurated.
 1979 –
 Arab League headquartered in Tunis.
 UNESCO designates the Medina of Tunis as a World Heritage Site.
 1982 – Palestine Lberation Organisation (PLO) moves from Beirut to Tunis
 1983 –
 National Theatre of Tunisia established.
 First Carthage Theatre Festival held.
 1984 – Population: 596,654 city; 1,394,749 urban agglomeration.
 1985 – Métro léger de Tunis begins operating.
 1988
 Israeli attack on PLO headquarters
 University of Carthage founded.
 1990 – Meeting of the Association Internationale des Maires Francophones held in city.
 1992 – Maison des arts "Dar el founoun" in operation.
 1993 – Palace Theatre opens.
 1996 – Theâtre de l'Étoile du Nord established.
 1998
 National School of Circus Arts established.
 Population: 702,330.
 2000 – Tunis El Manar University founded.

21st century

 2003 – Société des transports de Tunis formed.
 2004
 Population: 728,453.
 City hosts African Judo Championships.
 2007
  Islamist militants clash with security forces.
 Grand Prix de la ville de Tunis begins.
 2008 – Tunis Sports City construction begins.
 2009 – Stade Chedli Zouiten renovated.
 2010
 December – Protests.
 Air pollution in Tunis reaches annual mean of 38 PM2.5 and 90 PM10, more than recommended.
 2011
 Protests.
 Population: 790,000.
 2012	
 June – Salafists riot against art exhibit.
 August – Protests against reduction of women's rights.
 2014 – Population: 1,056,247 (urban agglomeration).
 2015
 18 March – The Bardo National Museum attack kills 21, mostly tourists.
 25 March – 2015 Tunis barracks shooting.
 24 November – The 2015 Tunis bombing.
 2016
 City hosts African Judo Championships.
 2018
 City hosts African Judo Championships.

See also
 Tunis history
 
 List of Beys of Tunis
 
 
 History of Tunisia

References

Bibliography

in English
Published in 19th century
 
 
 
 

Published in 20th century
 
 
 
 
 
  via Google Books
 

Published in 21st century

in French
  (+ table of contents)

External links

  (Images, etc.)
  (Images, etc.)
  (Images, etc.)
  (Bibliography)
  (Bibliography)
  (Bibliography)
  (Bibliography)
  (Bibliography of open access articles)
 
 

 
Tunis
Tunis
Years in Tunisia
Tunis